Newsome (previously Newsome and Central, 1973 to 1982) is a Kirklees Metropolitan Borough Council Ward in the Huddersfield Parliamentary constituency.

Councillors

 indicates seat up for re-election.

 indicates seat up for re-election after boundary changes.

 indicates seat up for re-election after casual vacancy.

Election Results (2004 to present)

Elections in the 2010s

May 2019
Candidates so far declared

May 2018

May 2016

May 2015

May 2014

May 2012

May 2011

May 2010

Elections in the 2000s

May 2008

May 2007

May 2006

June 2004

Election Results (1982 to 2003)

Elections in the 2000s

May 2003

May 2002

May 2000

Elections in the 1990s

May 1999

May 1998

May 1996

May 1995

May 1994

May 1992

May 1991

May 1990

Elections in the 1980s

May 1988

May 1987

May 1986

May 1984

May 1983

May 1982

Election Results (1973 to 1980)

Elections in the 1980s

May 1980

Elections in the 1970s

May 1979

May 1978

May 1976

May 1975

April 1973

Notes

• italics denote the sitting councillor • bold denotes the winning candidate

References

Geography of Huddersfield
Wards of Kirklees